Darren Rogers (born 6 May 1974) is an English former professional rugby league footballer who played in the 1990s and 2000s. Rogers also coached Huddersfield Blue Ghosts 2015 Varsity winning side. Darren was a regular try scorer for Castleford but left the club when they got relegated in 2004. He went on to play 2 seasons for Dewsbury Rams.

Background
Rogers was born on 6 May 1974 in Wakefield, West Yorkshire, England. He played junior rugby league at Stanley Rangers before being signed by Dewsbury in May 1991.

Playing career

International honours
Darren Rogers won caps for England while at Castleford in 1999 against France (2 matches), and in the 2000 Rugby League World Cup against Russia, Fiji, and Ireland.

Career Records
Darren Rogers holds the Castleford 'Most Tries In A Season' record, with 23-tries scored in 1999. Darren Rogers scored 206 tries in his career.

References

External links
(archived by web.archive.org) Profile at thecastlefordtigers.co.uk

1974 births
Living people
Castleford Tigers players
Dewsbury Rams players
England national rugby league team players
English rugby league players
Rugby league players from Wakefield
Rugby league centres
Rugby league fullbacks
Rugby league wingers
Salford Red Devils players